East Flores Regency is a regency in East Nusa Tenggara province of Indonesia. Established in 1958, the regency has its seat (capital) in Larantuka on Flores Island. It covers a land area of 1,812.85 km2, and it had a population of 232,605 as of the 2010 census and 276,896 at the 2020 Census; the official estimate as at mid 2021 was 283,626. The regency encompasses the eastern tip of the island of Flores, together with all of the smaller islands of Adonara and Solor, both part of the Solor Archipelago, and some much smaller offshore islands. In 1999 the island of Lembata (formerly called Lomblen) at the eastern end of the Archipelago was separated out to create its own Regency.

Administration 
The regency is divided into nineteen districts (kecamatan), tabulated below with their areas and their populations at the 2010 Census and the 2020 Census, together with the official estimates as at mid 2021. The table also includes the locations of the district administrative centres, the number of villages (rural desa and urban kelurahan) in each district, and its post code.

Note: (a) Adonara District covers only the northern part of Adonara Island ("Adonara Utara").

References

External links 

 

Regencies of East Nusa Tenggara
Flores Island (Indonesia)